Union Place is a suburb in Colombo, Sri Lanka. Union Place is located approximately 1 kilometre south-east from the centre of Colombo, Fort.

Demographic 
Union Place is a multi-religious and multi-ethnic area. The major ethnic communities in Union Place are Sinhalese and Sri Lankan Tamils. There are also various other minorities, such as Burghers, Sri Lankan Moors and others. Religions include Buddhism, Hinduism, Islam, Christianity and various other religions and beliefs to a lesser extent.

Diplomatic missions
Consulate of Austria
Honorary Consulate of Bhutan
Honorary Consulate of Namibia
Honorary Consulate of Uruguay
Honorary Consulate of Tunisia
Honorary Consulate of Croatia
Honorary Consulate of Czech Republic (Czechia)

References

Districts of Colombo
Populated places in Western Province, Sri Lanka